is a Japanese professional shogi player ranked 5-dan.

Early life
Nishida was born in Kyoto, Japan on August 25, 1991. He learned how to play shogi from a book that his parent bought for him, and made it to the semi-finals of the 28th  as a sixth-grade elementary school student in 2003 before losing to future fellow shogi professional and eventual tournament winner Kazuo Sugimoto.

Nishida entered the Japan Shogi Association's apprentice school at the rank of 6-kyū as a student of shogi professional  in April 2005. He was promoted to the rank of 3-dan in October 2008 and obtained professional status and the rank of 4-dan in April 2017 after winning the 60th 3-dan League (October 2016March 2017) with a record of 15 wins and 3 losses.

Shogi professional
In October 2017, Nishida defeated defending champion Junpei Ide 2 games to 1 to win the 7th .

Promotion history
The promotion history for Nishida is as follows:
 6-kyū: April 2005
 3-dan: October 2008
 4-dan: April 1, 2017
 5-dan: February 19, 2021

Titles and other championships
Nishida has yet to appear in a major title match, but has won one non-title shogi tournament.

References

External links
ShogiHub: Professional Player Info · Nishida, Takuya

Japanese shogi players
Living people
Professional shogi players
Professional shogi players from Kyoto Prefecture
1991 births
People from Kyoto
Kakogawa Seiryū